Trichomycterus poikilos is a species of pencil catfish endemic to Brazil, where it occurs in the Jacuí, Pardo and Taquari-das Antas river basins, tributaries of the Laguna dos Patos system, in the state of Rio Grande do Sul. This species reaches a maximum length of  SL.

Etymology
The specific name poikilos is derived from the Greek adjective ποικίλος, meaning variegated, varicolored, and refers to the intraspecific color pattern variation of the species.

Habitat and ecology
The species' type locality (municipality of Júlio de Castilhos, arroio Passo dos Buracos, upper Jacuí river basin) is a rapid flow river with clear water, a rocky bottom and submerged vegetation, located at approximately 405 m a.s.l.; at this site, T. poikilos is associated with the submerged vegetation.

T. poikilos feeds on aquatic larvae of Diptera (Simuliidae) and Lepidoptera and nymphs of the Ephemeroptera and Plecoptera.

References

Further reading

External links

 

poikilos
Fish of South America
Fish of Brazil
Endemic fauna of Brazil
Fish described in 2013